Alex Perry (born 29 July 1940) is a former Australian rules footballer who played for the Geelong Football Club in the Victorian Football League (VFL).

Notes

External links 

Living people
1940 births
Australian rules footballers from Victoria (Australia)
Geelong Football Club players
North Geelong Football Club players